Thiruchengode taluk is a taluk of Namakkal district of the Indian state of Tamil Nadu. The headquarters of the taluk is the town of Thiruchengode

Demographics
According to the 2011 census, the taluk of Tiruchengode had a population of 631,093 with 316,389  males and 314,704 females. There were 995 women for every 1000 men. The taluk had a literacy rate of 68.88. Child population in the age group below 6 was 26,488 Males and 24,861 Females.

Villages
 

[[paruthipalli]

References 

Taluks of Namakkal district